Cause for Divorce is a 1923 American silent drama film directed by Hugh Dierker and starring Fritzi Brunette, Helen Lynch, and Pat O'Malley.

Plot
As described in a film magazine review, Tom Parker's wife Laura, concerned because he does not devote enough time to her, narrowly escapes from being involved in a love affair with the wealthy Martin Sheldon. Martin's daughter Ruth, married to the young lawyer Howard Metcliffe, is dissatisfied with her marriage and plans an elopement with the Count Lorenz, who is a crook. When Ruth's automobile is involved in an accident and she is injured, she is brought to the nearest domicile, which is Laura's house. Ruth's father Martin comes, and is thunderstruck when he finds Laura there. After some discussions and reconsiderations, the domestic affairs are resolved all around for the two marriages.

Cast

References

Bibliography
 Munden, Kenneth White. The American Film Institute Catalog of Motion Pictures Produced in the United States, Part 1. University of California Press, 1997.

External links

1923 films
1923 drama films
1920s English-language films
American silent feature films
Silent American drama films
American black-and-white films
Films directed by Hugh Dierker
Selznick Pictures films
1920s American films